Dadal Airport is an airport in Mongolia. The airport is in Dadal, capital of the province of Khentii. It has an unpaved runway 14/32 .

See also
List of airports in Mongolia

Airports in Mongolia